Cereus is a genus of sea anemones in the family Sagartiidae.

Species
Species in the genus include:
 Cereus amethystinus (Quoy & Gaimard, 1833)
 Cereus herpetodes (McMurrich, 1904)
 Cereus pedunculatus (Pennant, 1777)
 Cereus filiformis (Rapp, 1829)

References

Sagartiidae
Hexacorallia genera